= Miller v Minister of Mines =

- Full case name: Hugh Thomas Miller Appellant v The Minister of Mines and The Attorney General
- Decided: 20 November 1962
- Citation: [1962] NZPC 1; [1962] UKPC 30; [1963] AC 484; [1963] NZLR 560; [1963] 2 WLR 92; [1963] 1 All ER 109
- Transcript: judgment

Miller v Minister of Mines [1962] NZPC 1; [1962] UKPC 30; [1963] AC 484; [1963] NZLR 560; [1963] 2 WLR 92; [1963] 1 All ER 109 is a cited case in New Zealand regarding property law.
